The Journal of Experimental Psychology: Applied is a peer-reviewed academic journal published by the American Psychological Association on behalf of APA Division 21. The journal was established in 1995 and covers research in experimental psychology. More specifically, the journal includes "empirical investigations in experimental psychology that bridge practically oriented problems and psychological theory". The editor-in-chief is Daniel G. Morrow (University of Illinois at Urbana-Champaign).

The journal has implemented the Transparency and Openness Promotion (TOP) Guidelines.  The TOP Guidelines provide structure to research planning and reporting and aim to make research more transparent, accessible, and reproducible.

Abstracting and indexing 
The journal is abstracted and indexed by MEDLINE/PubMed and the Social Sciences Citation Index. According to the Journal Citation Reports, the journal has a 2020 impact factor of 2.541.

References

External links 
 

American Psychological Association academic journals
English-language journals
Publications established in 1995
1995 establishments in the United States
Applied psychology journals